Maurice Williams (birth registered second ¼ 1942) is an English former professional rugby league footballer who played in the 1960s. He played at club level for Castleford (Heritage № 464).

Background
Maurice Williams' birth was registered in Pontefract district, West Riding of Yorkshire, England.

Playing career

County League appearances
Maurice Williams played in Castleford's victory in the Yorkshire County League during the 1964–65 season.

References

External links
Search for "Williams" at rugbyleagueproject.org
Maurice Williams Memory Box Search at archive.castigersheritage.com

1942 births
Living people
Castleford Tigers players
English rugby league players
Rugby league players from Pontefract